CIHC may refer to:

 Connacht Intermediate Hurling Championship, a hurling competition in Ireland
 CIHC-TV, a Canadian channel